The Church of Our Lady of Sorrows ( Shudhdhawu Wikshopa Devamatha Dewmædura) (also known as Kandawala Church and Kandawala Palliya)  is a Roman Catholic church located in Kandawala in the Archdiocese of Colombo, Sri Lanka.

Kandawala parish was home to the Church of Our Lady of Sorrows at Kandawala, St. Theresa's Church at Batapattala and Church of Infant Jesus at Demanhandiya. The Mission House of Kandawala Parish is also located at the church Our Lady of Sorrows Premises. 

Kandawala Parish has a long history of hosting Passion Plays, with Yagaya being the best known.

Feast

The annual Feast of our Lady of Sorrows Church is usually held in the 3rd Sunday of September or it will be held in the Sunday on or after September 15.

Past Parish Priests 
Rev. Fr. Francis Fernando
Rev. Fr. Merril Wijesinghe
Rev. Fr. Reginald Saparamadu 
Rev. Fr. H. D. Anthony
Rev. Fr. Sarath Thirimanne
Rev. Fr. Canicius Neris 
Rev. Fr. Srikantha Fernando (Incumbent)

Holy Family Convent
The Holy Family Convent is situated next to the church of Our Lady of Sorrows, established on 20 September 1902.

References

Roman Catholic churches in Sri Lanka
Churches in Negombo
Roman Catholic churches completed in 1957
20th-century Roman Catholic church buildings